Alpine High School is a public high school located in the city of Alpine, Texas (USA) and is classified as a 3A school by the UIL. It is a part of the Alpine Independent School District located in north-central Brewster County. In 2015, the school was rated "Met Standard" by the Texas Education Agency.

History
In 1994 the school had 350 students.

Prior to 1996 Alpine High School served as the high school for students from Terlingua Common School District. A trip to and from Alpine High totaled . In 1994 about 24 students took this bus. This means adding an additional 45 minutes each way, which involved parents having to wake up early. Due to the distance and because there was only one bus each day, Terlingua area students could not participate in extracurricular activities after school. Additionally there was a 30% dropout rate among Terlingua area students. Additionally San Vicente Independent School District sent its high school students to Alpine High. In 1996 Big Bend High School opened in temporary facilities, and the Terlingua area students no longer came to Alpine High. The same year San Vicente ISD students were also redirected to Big Bend High.

Service area
Currently the high school serves Alpine. Residents of the Sul Ross State University family housing units, Lobo Village 5 through 7, are zoned to Alpine ISD schools.

Prior to 1996 the school served, in addition to Alpine, Lajitas, Panther Junction, and Terlingua. The San Vicente and Terlingua districts include Big Bend National Park.

Academic awards
UIL Team Debate Champions 
1960 (2A) Boys, 1962 (2A) Girls

Athletics
The Alpine Bucks compete in the following sports.

Baseball
Basketball
Cross Country
Football
Golf
Powerlifting
Softball
Tennis
Track and Field
Volleyball

State Titles
Boys Golf
1965 (2A)
Girls Golf
1986 (3A)

State Finalist
Baseball
1994(3A)
Volleyball
1985 (3A), 1986 (3A)

Theater
One Act Play 
1958 (B)

2016 shooting
On September 8, 2016, a female student shot and injured another student in a school hallway and then committed suicide in the bathroom. A Homeland Security officer who responded to the shooting was accidentally shot by a U.S. Marshal during the incident.

See also
Other high schools in Brewster County:
 Marathon High School

References

External links
 

Public high schools in Texas
Schools in Brewster County, Texas